In geometry, a hypercubic honeycomb is a family of regular honeycombs (tessellations) in -dimensional spaces with the Schläfli symbols  and containing the symmetry of Coxeter group  (or ) for .

The tessellation is constructed from 4 -hypercubes per ridge. The vertex figure is a cross-polytope 

The hypercubic honeycombs are self-dual.

Wythoff construction classes by dimension 

A Wythoff construction is a method for constructing a uniform polyhedron or plane tiling.

The two general forms of the hypercube honeycombs are the regular form with identical hypercubic facets and one semiregular, with alternating hypercube facets, like a checkerboard.

A third form is generated by an expansion operation applied to the regular form, creating facets in place of all lower-dimensional elements. For example, an expanded cubic honeycomb has cubic cells centered on the original cubes, on the original faces, on the original edges, on the original vertices, creating 4 colors of cells around in vertex in 1:3:3:1 counts.

The orthotopic honeycombs are a family topologically equivalent to the cubic honeycombs but with lower symmetry, in which each of the three axial directions may have different edge lengths.  The facets are hyperrectangles, also called orthotopes; in 2 and 3 dimensions the orthotopes are rectangles and cuboids respectively.

See also 
 Alternated hypercubic honeycomb
 Quarter hypercubic honeycomb
 Simplectic honeycomb
 Truncated simplectic honeycomb
 Omnitruncated simplectic honeycomb

References 
 Coxeter, H.S.M. Regular Polytopes, (3rd edition, 1973), Dover edition,  
 pp. 122–123. (The lattice of hypercubes γn form the cubic honeycombs, δn+1)
 pp. 154–156: Partial truncation or alternation, represented by h prefix: h{4,4}={4,4}; h{4,3,4}={31,1,4}, h{4,3,3,4}={3,3,4,3}
 p. 296, Table II: Regular honeycombs, δn+1

Honeycombs (geometry)
Polytopes
Regular tessellations